This article details the complete works of British vocalist Mark Stewart.

As a solo artist

Studio albums

Extended plays

Compilation albums

Singles

With The Pop Group

Studio albums

Live albums

Compilation albums

Singles

Music videos

References

External links
 Mark Stewart at AllMusic
 
 

Discography
Discographies of British artists
Rock music group discographies